Brandon Baker (born April 18, 1985) is an American former actor. He is known for the made-for-television movies, such as Disney movie Johnny Tsunami alongside Kirsten Storms and the late Lee Thompson Young and its sequel Johnny Kapahala: Back on Board as well as for his role on the NBC sitcom One World. He also appeared in four episodes of the Disney Channel Original Series, Even Stevens and he voiced Duke Anoi in eight episodes of Disney Channel animated series, The Proud Family.

Biography 
Baker was born on April 18, 1985, in Anaheim, California. He is of English, German, and Filipino descent. Baker lives with his family including his sister, Cassie and his brother, Kullen. He started acting when he was 11 years old after seeing some of his friends going to auditions. At 12 years old, Baker landed his first big break with the starring role of "Mowgli" in Walt Disney's Jungle Book: Mowgli's Story. Baker was invited to the 2007 Disney Channel games after Zac Efron dropped out. He currently lives in Los Angeles. He also starred alongside Jessica Alba in the 1999 movie P.U.N.K.S.

After a six-year hiatus, Baker starred in the 2014 comedy The Formula alongside Reginald VelJohnson and Sasha Jackson.

In 2015, Baker retired from acting and became a wedding officiant at a wedding planning company, Simply Eloped. Brandon made a brief return to the spotlight in 2019 when he guest starred on Christy's Kitchen Throwbacks, a web channel hosted by fellow former Disney Channel actor Christy Carlson Romano.

Filmography

Film

Television

Web series

References

External links 
 
 

1985 births
Living people
21st-century American male actors
American male child actors
American male film actors
American male television actors
American male voice actors
American people of English descent
American people of Filipino descent
American people of German descent
Male actors from Anaheim, California
University of California, Santa Barbara alumni